Marko Marić (born 1987) is a politician in Serbia. He has served in the Assembly of Vojvodina since 2020 as a member of the Serbian Progressive Party.

Private career
Marić holds a bachelor's degree in economics. He lives in Sombor and was appointed to the city's youth council in 2016. He is not to be confused with a different Marko Marić who served in the Assembly of Vojvodina from 2012 to 2020 as a member of the Party of United Pensioners of Serbia.

Politician
Marić received the forty-second position on the Progressive Party's Aleksandar Vučić — For Our Children electoral list in the 2020 Vojvodina provincial election and was elected when the list won a majority victory with seventy-six out of 120 mandates. He is a member of the assembly committee on economy and the committee on youth and sports.

References

1987 births
Living people
Politicians from Sombor
Members of the Assembly of Vojvodina
Serbian Progressive Party politicians